Daniel Lee Frantz (born July 9, 1977) is a former American football kicker. He was released by the Chicago Rush on June 3, 2008. He has also played for the San Jose SaberCats.

High school years
Frantz attended Columbia River High School in Vancouver, Washington and played football, soccer, basketball, and track and field.

College years
He played football collegiately at Portland State University.

External links
Stats from arenafan.com

1977 births
Living people
Sportspeople from Vancouver, Washington
Players of American football from Washington (state)
American football placekickers
Portland State Vikings football players
San Jose SaberCats players
Chicago Rush players
Orlando Predators players